Tanner Owen (born September 16, 1996) is an American football offensive tackle who is a free agent. He played college football at Missouri and Northwest Missouri State.

Professional career

Buffalo Bills
Owen signed with the Buffalo Bills as an undrafted free agent on April 30, 2022, following the 2022 NFL Draft. He was waived as part of the team's final roster cuts on August 28, 2022.

New Orleans Saints
On August 29, 2022, Owen was claimed off waivers by the New Orleans Saints and made the team's final roster. He was waived on September 8, 2022 and re-signed to the practice squad. He was released on September 12.

References

External links
 New Orleans Saints bio
 Northwest Missouri State Bearcats bio
 Missouri Tigers bio

1996 births
Living people
American football offensive tackles
Players of American football from Missouri
Missouri Tigers football players
Northwest Missouri State Bearcats football players
Buffalo Bills players
New Orleans Saints players